Madathisanotia is a monotypic moth genus of the family Noctuidae erected by Pierre Viette in 1970. Its only species, Madathisanotia madagascariensis, was first described by Walter Rothschild in 1924. It is known from northern Madagascar.

References

External links
Images on Flickr

Amphipyrinae
Moths of Madagascar
Monotypic moth genera